Constantin "Titi" Aur (born 25 December 1963 in Bârlad) is a Romanian rally driver.

He has won eight Romanian rally championships (1995, 1997, 1998, 1999, 2000, 2001, 2002, 2006) and is the first Romanian rally driver to participate in a full season of World Rally Championship in 2003. He scored 2 points in the ADAC Rallye Deutschland, to finish 19th in the 2003 Production Car World Rally Championship (PCWRC). Aur is a long-time friend of WRC driver Manfred Stohl of Austria.

In 2006, Titi Aur won a record-breaking eighth national title driving a Mitsubishi Lancer Evo IX for the OMV-Petrom Rally Team, in the Romanian National Rally Championship (CNR), organized by the FRAS. In 2007, the 43-year-old rally veteran switched to Viola BkP rally team to defend last year's title, but the team lost sponsorship during the season. Aur won the 2007 Raliul Avram Iancu, his last overall win to this date. In 2010, aged 47, Titi Aur returned for a full season in the CNR, joining champion squad Jack Daniel's Rally Team, again in a Mitsubishi Lancer Evo IX.

Results

WRC results

External links 
 Titi Aur - siteul oficial
 Constantin Aur fansite
 Interview with Constantin Aur (in Romanian)
 FRAS website
 Constantin Aur Biography up to date

1963 births
Living people
Sportspeople from Bârlad
Romanian rally drivers